Sajer FC is a Saudi Arabian football club based in Sajer, Riyadh and competes in the Saudi Second Division, the third tier of Saudi football. The club also consists of various other departments including volleyball, weightlifting and cycling.

The club was founded in 1976 under the name of Hawazin Club by Eid bin Abdullah Al-Gablan. The club changed its name to Al-Yamamah Club in 1981. On 12 December 2016, the club once again changed its name, but this time under the name of the city it is based in, Sajer FC.

Sajer won their first promotion to the Saudi Second Division during the 2021–22 season after finishing first in their group. They lost in the semi-finals to Al-Qous.

Current squad 
As of 1 August 2021:

References

External links

Football clubs in Saudi Arabia
Football clubs in Sajer
1976 establishments in Saudi Arabia
Association football clubs established in 1976